"Let's Dance" is a 1962 hit single by Chris Montez, written and produced by Jim Lee.

Original version
The song was written by Jim Lee, who produced and released the song on his own Monogram Records.
The personnel on the original 1962 recording included Joel Hill on guitar, Ray Johnson on organ, Ray Pohlman on bass guitar and Jesse Sailes on drums. When initially released, the song shot to #4 on the Billboard Hot 100 chart in the U.S., and to No. 2 in the UK Singles Chart.

In 1972 the song was coupled as an "oldie" with the Shirelles "Will You Love Me Tomorrow" and re-released in Europe. Based on radio play, the record company, London Records, quickly removed the Shirelles cut and replaced it with the original flip side "You're the One". Consequently, the recording reached the top five for a second time, in both Britain and Germany. It was also the title track of a 1972 album by Montez.

Charts

Ola and the Janglers version

Throughout 1968, Ola and the Janglers chart success had started waning. Between January and March of that year, they had released three singles; all of them failed to chart on both Kvällstoppen and Tio i Topp. The band's lead singer, Ola Håkansson, found the song while listening to Kvällstoppen on Sveriges Radio P3 in 1962, when Chris Montez original single reached number one in Sweden. Though they never incorporated it into their setlist at the time, upon their chart success waining they thought it was a good song to record as a single. It was recorded with Sonet Records owner Gunnar Bergström producing. The B-side, "Hear Me", was written by the band's guitarist Claes af Geijerstam, which features distinct influences from baroque pop and a similar chord progression to the Kinks "Sunny Afternoon". The single got released in Sweden in September 1968 through the Sonet sub-label Gazell Records.

It became the Janglers last hit when it entered Tio i Topp at a position of six on October 19, 1968. It peaked on top of the chart on November 9, staying there for four weeks until "Little Arrows" by Leapy Lee replaced it on December 7. It was last seen at a position of number 12 on January 25, 1969.  The song debuted on Kvällstoppen on November 5, 1968 at a position of 11, before peaking at number one on December 3, staying on the top for a week. It exited on January 28, 1969 after spending 13 weeks on the charts. The single was released in April 1969 in both the United States and the United Kingdom, through GNP Crescendo and Sonet Records respectively. To the surprise of Håkansson, it started selling well in California which led to it charting nationally. It entered the Billboard Hot 100 on May 31, 1969 before peaking at number 92 on June 7, dropping out that same week.

The success of the single was so sudden that the album which it appears on was originally going to be titled Fingertip before Gazell decided to name it after the song. Similarly, the Swedish sleeve for the single was issued in over ten different colors and variations because of the countless re-presses which has led to some copies becoming collector items. Despite the unexpected chart success of the single, Ola and the Janglers called it quits in December of 1968. According to Håkansson, "It was a feather in my cap, but then I got tired. We had toured both in Sweden and abroad. You felt like you were just sitting in a touring car and living in a hotel room." Although Siw Malmkvist's song "Sole Sole Sole" with Umberto Marcato had reached the Billboard chart in 1964, it was billed a solo single and as such "Let's Dance" marked the first time a Swedish group charted in the US,  something Håkansson states "other groups could only dream of at the time."

Personnel 

 Ola Håkansson – lead vocals, handclaps, tambourine
 Johannes "Jonte" Olsson – hammond organ, backing vocals
 Åke Eldsäter – bass guitar
 Claes af Geijerstam – lead and rhythm guitar, backing vocals
 Leif Johansson – drums, percussion

Charts

Slade version

"Let's Dance" was covered by British rock band Slade in 1985 for their studio/compilation album Crackers – The Christmas Party Album. The version was produced by bassist Jim Lea. In 1988, the band released their version as a single, dubbed the "1988 Remix". It failed to chart in the UK.

Background
Having reverted to their own independent label Cheapskate in 1987, Slade were largely inactive in 1988, having agreed to take an 18-month break. However, in November 1988, the band decided to release their 1985 cover of "Let's Dance" as a single, but it failed to gain sufficient radio airplay and did not reach the charts.
"Let's Dance" had been recorded for Crackers. In a 1989 interview with Guitarist, guitarist Dave Hill recalled: "We just did a rock version of it for a laugh, and thought we'd stick it out." Speaking of the band's decision to release it as a single, Holder said in a 1989 fan club interview: "We thought it was a good track. We decided that "Let's Dance" stood a good chance of getting some airplay so we decided to put the record out, but it wasn't the case. Only the commercial stations like Piccadilly and some of the others played it regularly, but without Radio One, you're sunk."

Release
"Let's Dance" was released on 7" vinyl and 3" CD by Cheapskate Records in the UK only. The 7" vinyl included the B-side "Standing on the Corner", which was an album track taken from the band's 1974 album Slade in Flame. For the CD version, two extra tracks were added; "Far Far Away" and "How Does It Feel". Both were also taken from Slade in Flame.

Critical reception
Upon its release, the single was reviewed on the BBC Radio 1 programme Singled Out. Those who reviewed the single were producers Stock, Aitken, and Waterman. All three reminisced about the band with DJ Mike Read, stating what a great band they were. Mike Stock commented that Noddy Holder was the greatest pure rock 'n' roll singer since John Lennon.

Formats
7" Single
"Let's Dance (1988 Remix)" – 2:40
"Standing on the Corner" – 4:54

CD Single
"Let's Dance (1988 Remix)" – 2:40
"Far Far Away" – 3:37
"How Does It Feel" – 5:55
"Standing on the Corner" – 4:54

Personnel
Slade
Noddy Holder – lead vocals
Jim Lea – synthesiser, bass, backing vocals, producer of "Let's Dance"
Dave Hill – lead guitar, backing vocals
Don Powell – drums

Additional personnel
Chas Chandler – producer of "Standing on the Corner", "Far Far Away" and "How Does It Feel"

Other charting covers
British rock band Status Quo included "Let's Dance" in their 1990 medley "The Anniversary Waltz (Part One)", which was a hit throughout Europe and hit #2 on the UK Singles Chart.

Other covers

Other artists who have covered the song include:
 French singer Sylvie Vartan in 1962, in French, under the title "Dansons", with French lyrics by André Salvet
 Tony Sheridan with the backing band called The Beat Brothers, in 1962, although it was not released in the UK until 1967, on the album The Beatles' First (though none of The Beatles appear on that track)
 The Routers, on their 1963 album 'Let's Go! With The Routers'
 Under the title "Oye niña", sing Enrique Guzmán in Spanish, in "Canta mi Corazón" (My Heart Sings) a 1965 Mexican film
 The Ramones, on their 1976 self-titled debut album
 Marc Bolan and T-Rex, on a 1977 episode of the TV show Marc
 Silicon Teens, on their debut 1980 album Music For Parties
 British glam rock band Mud on their 1982 album Mud featuring Les Gray
 Juice Newton, on her 1984 album Can't Wait All Night
 Tina Turner and David Bowie, on Turner's 1988 album Tina Live in Europe, in a medley with Bowie's own song "Let's Dance"
 The Cockroaches, in a recording featured in the Australian film The Crossing (1990)
 Bruno Brookes, Liz Kershaw and the Radio 1 DJ Possee recorded a version for Children in Need in 1990

References

1962 singles
1962 songs
Chris Montez songs
Songs about dancing
1988 singles
Slade songs
Song recordings produced by Jim Lea
Number-one singles in Belgium
Number-one singles in Sweden